Abbess, Beauchamp and Berners Roding is a group of three small villages in the County of Essex, England. Collectively, they form one civil parish in the Epping Forest district of Essex.

According to the 2001 census it had a population of 427, increasing to 481 at the 2011 census. The parish includes Abbess Roding, Beauchamp Roding, and Berners Roding, three of The Rodings, the hamlet of Birds Green, and the small settlement of Nether Street.

The parish was formed in 1946 when the three parishes merged.

Parish make-up 

  Village of Abbess Roding
  Village of Beauchamp Roding
  Village of Berners Roding

References

External links

Abbess, Beauchamp and Berners Roding Parish Council, Retrieved 8 February 2018

1946 establishments in England
Epping Forest District
Civil parishes in Essex